Basic Education High School No. 1 Dagon (formerly, Methodist English High School; commonly known as ဒဂုံ ၁ ), located a few miles north of downtown Yangon is considered one of the best public high schools  in Myanmar. Dagon 1 offers classes from kindergarten to tenth standard (recently renamed Grade 1 to Grade 11) to about 6500 students.

Attended almost exclusively by the children of the wealthy, Dagon 1 has some of the best educational facilities available in a Burmese private school. The school routinely sends a disproportionate share of outstanding students to the country's most selective universities each year. Its most famous alumna is the Nobel Peace Prize Laureate Aung San Suu Kyi. Many of the Burmese entertainment industry's top stars are Dagon 1 alumni. Dagon 1 in recent year has lost some of its appeal as a top school as ultra-wealthy parents now send their children to expensive English language medium "international" private schools.

The school's main colonial era building is on the Yangon City Heritage List.

History 

The school was founded in 1882 as Methodist Episcopal Girls School on Lewis Street (now Seikkantha Street). In 1894, the school was moved to its current campus on the corner of Lancaster Road (now Nawaday Road) and Signal Pagoda Road, and was also renamed Methodist English Girls High School. At first, boys were accepted only in the elementary level (from K to 3). During the interwar period, boys were allowed from K to 4. Just before World War II, the school had 55 students. The school was closed down for 6 years after World War II and later reopened in May, 1947. The principal, Mrs. Logie, repaired the school buildings that were destroyed during the war. At that time, the school began to prepare its students not only for the matriculation exam but also for the GCE (General Certificate of Education) exam from the University of London.

In 1951, the number of students increased to 850 and the four-story Kindergarten building (113'×51') with 15 rooms was built in 1952 to accommodate the students. The school's name was Methodist English High School (MEHS). On 14 April 1965, the institution was nationalized and became a public school and has been operated by the government ever since. In 1986, a new three-story building (90'×34') was built to correspond to the increased number of students. The school is currently running under the Department of Basic Education which is directly controlled by the Ministry of Education.

During 1988 democracy uprising, Dagon1 was one of the first high schools in Burma to form student union and participate in the protest boycott marches. Throughout the uprising, members of Dagon1 student union lead their fellow students and teachers in various protest marches.  Dagon1 protest column can be clearly distinguished amongst other columns by their Green Flag with White Fighting Peacock emblem, former official flag of All Burma Federation of Student Unions and the green and white represents the uniform colours of high school students.  After September 1988 coup by the military, some of dagon1 students went to Thai-Burma border and joined All Burma Student Democratic Front (ABSDF) to achieve democracy and human rights in Burma through armed struggle.

Student body 

Dagon 1 has the largest student body in Yangon and in Myanmar, numbering near 6,600. A high student-to-teacher ratio exists, like most of the schools in Myanmar. The students are spread across eleven standards or grades, from Grade 1 (formerly Kindergarten) to Grade 11 (formerly Tenth Standard). Because an increasing demand for enrollment at the school, Dagon 1's student body is in the shape of a pyramid, with the number of younger students outnumbering that of older students. New classes are formed to handle the increased enrollment each year.

Uniform 

Like all public schools in Myanmar, Dagon-1 requires that students wear the school uniform at all times. There are two sets of uniform, one for wear from Kindergarten to 5th Standard (Grades 1 to 6), and another, more traditional one for wear from the 6th Standard to 10th Standard (Grades 7 to 11). But all uniforms are of the same colour - a white shirt or blouse, with a green garment for the torso.

School badge 

A circular badge, bearing an oil lamp (representing wisdom and education), with a circular cogwheel and a rice plant together with the school's name. Inside the cogwheel, there are 5 coloured sections: Orange, Yellow, Green, Red and Blue representing the school council team colors.

Boys uniform 

 From Grade 1 to the Grade 5, male students are required to wear a white shirt (with or without the collar), tucked into a green long pants. Tee shirts and sports shirts are not acceptable. Shoes and the traditional slipper, Hnyat-phanat are permitted as footwear.
 From the Grade 6 onwards, the students have to wear a white shirt (with or without the collar), and a green paso. Only the Hnyat-phanat is permitted. Traditional Mandalay slippers, usually of velvet or other materials, are worn.

Girls uniform 

 Girls have to wear a white bow hair-clip on their heads.
 From Grade 1 to Grade 5, girls can wear either skirts or pants, with a white shirt. Girls usually wear slippers.
 For Grade 6 onwards, the uniform also becomes more traditional like its male counterpart. The girl must wear only the side opening (yin-phone) traditional Burmese blouse, with the Htamein as the lower garment.

Accomplishments 

It ranks the highest overall in Burmese High School in the University Entrance Examination, conducted by the Board of Examinations. Dagon-1's student body produces many high scoring students both in terms of collective subjects and individual subjects, making into the very competitive "nationwide outstanding top-ten students' list", colloquially known as the whole-Burma or top ten list quite often.

Although Myanmar's education system is extremely academic oriented, Dagon-1 has been able to produce some good athletes and artists. Dagon 1 has produced many nationally selected athletes, in the fields of swimming, football (soccer), sailing, wushu, and badminton, have won medals in both national and international competitions, such as South East Asian Games.

Many students have also won medals in "Myanmar Traditional and Cultural Performing Arts Competition" (So-Ka-Yay-Tee) and win painting competitions.

In 2011, the top nine scorers of the 2011 Matriculation Exam came from Dagon 1. In 2015, the four of the top 10 scorers in the 2015 Matriculation Exam came from Dagon 1.

Renovations 

Due to increasing number of students, a new seven-story building was built in front of the soccer field. To build this building, an old cafeteria building was demolished. With the rising use of the internet and government promotion of information technology, two IT labs have been added to the campus facilities. The Dagon Thiri hall, Chemistry Lab, Physics Lab and Biology Labs are renovated in 2004 for the practical classes. A new cafeteria building was also built and renovated year by year. Security cameras were also installed within the school campus. Some classrooms had been renovated and installed air-conditioners donated by students.

Facilities and buildings 

 Three-storey Victorian-era style building (Main Building)
 Five-storey Building
 Three-storey Building
 Seven-storey Building
 Dagon Thiri Hall
 Computer Hall
 Gymnasium
 School Garden
 Band and orchestra practicing rooms
 The Library building at the ground floor of new seven-storey building.
 A Soccer field - Every rainy season, the football matches are held.
 Canteen
 Dagon Thiri Hall - used for religious ceremonies, school reunions and stage shows
 Biology, Physics and Chemistry Labs - On the 5th floor of five-storey building.
 Gymnasium - It also serves as a back-up assembly hall and basketball ground.
 Computer Training Hall - built beside the assembly hall under the government's policy to embrace information technology.
 Multimedia Teaching Lab - Also use as English Language training room.
 IT Lab
 Tennis Court - Inside the garden in front of the school.

List of principals 

 Doreen Logie (1947–1965)
 Tun Tin (1965–1966)
 Aung Than (1966–1977)
 Tin Myint (1977–1983)
 Naing Aung (1983–1992)
 Than Swe (1992–1996)
 Kyaw Kyaw (1996–2007)
 Dr. Aung Ko Ko (2007–2012)
 Aung Ko Ko (2012–2015) 
 Chit Tun (2016–2018)
 Daw Myint Myint Aye (2018–2020)
 Than Naing (2020-2022)
 Dr. Sandar Mya Nyein (2022-present)
 Khit Tha Khin (2022-2023)

Notable alumni

Academia 

 Thaw Kaung

Actors 
 Dwe
 Kyaw Thu
 Soe Thu
 Yaza Ne Win
 Thu Riya

Actresses 

 Wah Wah Win Shwe
 Eindra Kyaw Zin
 Hsu Eaint San
 Poe Ei Ei Khant
 A Nyein Phyu

Businessmen 

 Michael Moe Myint

Directors 

 Thura (Zarganar)
 Sin Yaw Mg Mg

Statesmen and politicians 

 Aung San Suu Kyi
 Htin Kyaw

Singers 

 Than E (Bilat Pyan Than, Ma Than E Fend, Dora)
 Aung Yin
 Hayma Ne Win
 May Sweet  
 Nay Win
 Bobby Soxer 
 Raymond
 Nan Su Yati Soe

References

External links 

 Official School alumni website
 M.E.H.S Methodist English High School alumni website

High schools in Yangon